Trappes is a commune in the Yvelines department, region of Île-de-France, north-central France. It is a banlieue located in the western suburbs of Paris,  from the center of Paris, in the new town of Saint-Quentin-en-Yvelines.

Transport
Trappes is served by Trappes station on the Transilien La Défense and Transilien Paris-Montparnasse suburban rail lines.

Population

Crime
The suburb is known for gang violence and poverty. It also has Islamists among its large Muslim population, with 70 local people suspected of having left France to fight for the Islamic State, according to several sources. According to the French government, 67 people from Trappes have joined the Islamic State, and others have carried out attacks inside France.

In July 2013, Trappes police station was attacked by a mob of French Muslims in response to the arrest of a man who had assaulted a police officer during an identity check on his entirely veiled wife (face covering is illegal in France). A man on the terrorism watch list of the French police, killed his mother and sister with a knife in Trappes on August 23, 2018. Amaq News Agency claimed responsibility on behalf of the Islamic State. However, French interior minister Gérard Collomb stated he was a man with mental health issues, rather than someone inspired by the organisation.

Education
There are 36 municipal preschools and primary schools in Trappes.

The community has three junior high schools:
 Collège Le Village
 Collège Gustave Courbet 
 Collège Youri-Gagarine

Senior high schools/sixth form colleges:
Lycée des métiers Louis Blériot
Lycée des métiers Henri Matisse
Lycée de la Plaine de Neauphle

Climate

Notable people
Nicolas Anelka, footballer
Odile Bailleux, organist and harpsichordist
Eddy Ben Arous, rugby player
Barbara Cabrita, actress
Jamel Debbouze, comedian and actor
La Fouine, rapper
Massadio Haïdara, footballer
Kevin Harley, basketball player
Cyril Paglino, entrepreneur
Linda Pradel, handball player
Shy'm, singer
Omar Sy, comedian and actor

Twin towns – sister cities

Trappes is twinned with:
 Castiglione del Lago, Italy (1971)
 Congleton, England, United Kingdom (1962)
 Kopřivnice, Czech Republic (1970)

See also
Communes of the Yvelines department

References

External links

 Official website 

Communes of Yvelines
Saint-Quentin-en-Yvelines
Yvelines communes articles needing translation from French Wikipedia